Leopold Rügheimer (May 5, 1850 – May 24, 1917) was a notable German chemist whose name is connected to the Staedel-Rugheimer pyrazine synthesis, a reaction that was discovered by himself and Wilhelm Staedel. Rügheimer was born in Walldorf (near Meiningen) in 1850 as the son of a merchant. He studied at the universities of Leipzig, Würzburg and Tübingen. He died in Kiel in 1917 after a successful academic career.

Career

Rügheimer's professional career:

Scientific contributions:

 Published an article together with Wilhelm Staedel concerning the synthesis of pyrazines by reacting α-haloketones with ammonia. This procedure is now known as the Staedel-Rugheimer pyrazine synthesis.
 First synthesis of tropic acid in 1880, together with Albert Ladenburg.
 First synthesis of piperine (1882).

See also
Staedel-Rugheimer pyrazine synthesis

References

W Pötsch. Lexikon bedeutender Chemiker (VEB Bibliographisches Institut Leipzig, 1988)
E von Lippmann. Zeittafeln zur Geschichte der organischen Chemie (Julius Springer, 1921)
A J Humphrey, D O'Hagan. Tropane alkaloid biosynthesis. A century old problem unresolved. Nat. Prod. Rep. 18 (2001) 494-502

1850 births
1917 deaths
19th-century German chemists
20th-century German chemists